The iPhrothiya yeSiliva - Silver Protea, post-nominal letters PS, was instituted by the President of the Republic of South Africa on 16 April 2003 and came into effect on 27 April 2003. It can be awarded to all ranks who have distinguished themselves by outstanding leadership or outstanding meritorious service and particular devotion to duty. It is South Africa's second highest existing military decoration for meritorious conduct.

The South African military
The Union Defence Forces (UDF) were established in 1912 and renamed the South African Defence Force (SADF) in 1958. On 27 April 1994, it was integrated with six other independent forces into the South African National Defence Force (SANDF).

Institution
The iPhrothiya yeSiliva - Silver Protea, post-nominal letters PS, was instituted by the President on 16 April 2003 and came into effect on 27 April 2003, to replace the Southern Cross Medal (SM) and Pro Merito Medal (PMM). The bilingual title of the decoration is in siSwati and English.

Award criteria
The decoration can be awarded to all ranks of the South African National Defence Force and of any Auxiliary Service of the SANDF, and of any Armed Forces attached to or serving with or rendering any service to the SANDF, who have distinguished themselves by outstanding leadership or outstanding meritorious service and particular devotion to duty. The decoration is the second most senior of a set of three military decorations for merit, along with the iPhrothiya yeGolide - Golden Protea and the iPhrothiya yeBhronzi - Bronze Protea.

A bar may be awarded for every subsequent action which would make recipients eligible for the award of the same decoration. The decoration and bar may be awarded posthumously.

Guidelines consisting of appropriate phrases which may be useful when writing a citation for the award of the iPhrothiya yeSiliva - Silver Protea have been published by the South African Defence Department.

Outstanding Leadership
 More than usual.
 Aptitude, talent, ability.
 Creativity.
 Ability to persevere.

Outstanding Meritorious Service
 Positive and visible permanent results for the SANDF, at least on the level of significant benefit to the Service.
 Unusual achievement/performance.
 Particular contribution.
 Example or role model.
 Positive conduct sheet.
 Initiative.

Particular devotion to duty
 Single occasion or over a period of time.
 Special.
 Outstanding.
 Remarkable.

Order of wear

The position of the iPhrothiya yeSiliva - Silver Protea in the official military and national orders of precedence is as follows:

  
Official military order of precedence
 Preceded by the Silver Medal for Merit (SMM) of the Azanian People's Liberation Army.
 Succeeded by the Danie Theron Medal (DTM) of the Republic of South Africa.

Official national order of precedence
 Preceded by the Silver Medal for Merit (SMM) of the Azanian People's Liberation Army.
 Succeeded by the Danie Theron Medal (DTM) of the Republic of South Africa.

Description
Obverse
The iPhrothiya yeSiliva - Silver Protea is a six-pointed star, struck in silver and displaying a stylised protea, South Africa's national flower, on a blue hexagon in the centre.

Reverse
The reverse bears, in relief, the Coat of arms of South Africa. The decoration is attached to a plain silver suspender fixed to the upper point of the star. The medal number is stamped or engraved below the Coat of Arms.

Ribbon
The ribbon is 32 millimetres wide and national flag blue, with a 2 millimetres wide white band, a 2 millimetres wide black band, a 2 millimetres wide gold band, a 2 millimetres wide black band and a 2 millimetres wide white band in the centre.

Bar
The bar for subsequent conferments of the iPhrothiya yeSiliva - Silver Protea is 33 millimetres wide and 5 millimetres high, struck in silver and embossed in the centre with a silhouette replica of the decoration. When only a ribbon bar is worn, a button silhouette replica of the decoration, 8 millimetres in diameter and struck in silver, is affixed to the ribbon bar.

Insignia
Award of the decoration for service in active military operations is indicated by distinguishing insignia, which indicate the arm of the service in which the recipient was serving at the time of the action for which the decoration was conferred. The insignia are struck in silver and is worn on the ribbon, above any bars which may have been awarded.
 Crossed swords for the South African Army.
 An eagle for the South African Air Force.
 An Anchor for the South African Navy.
 The Rod of Aesculapius for the South African Military Health Service.

Recipients
In respect of those recipients about whom it is available, the actions they were cited for follow below the table since inclusion in the table itself is impractical.

Note 1:  denotes a posthumous award.

Actions cited for

References

Military decorations and medals of South Africa
2003 establishments in South Africa
Awards established in 2003